Isabella Shannon (born 30 June 2001) is an Australian rules footballer who played for St Kilda in the AFL Women's (AFLW).

In May 2022, Shannon was delisted by St Kilda, to allow her to focus on her studies.

References

External links

 

Living people
2001 births
Dandenong Stingrays players (NAB League Girls)
St Kilda Football Club (AFLW) players
Australian rules footballers from Victoria (Australia)
Sportswomen from Victoria (Australia)